Mary Booth may refer to:
Mary Ann Booth (1843–1922), American microscopist
Mary H. C. Booth (1831–1865), American poet
Mary Louise Booth (1831–1889), American writer and translator, founding editor of Harper's Bazaar, 1867–1889
Mary Josephine Booth (1876–1965), American librarian, Librarian of Eastern Illinois University, 1904–1945
 Mary Booth (died 1865), close friend and associate of German-American activist and suffragette Mathilde Franziska Anneke
 Lady Mary Booth, wife of Harry Grey, 4th Earl of Stamford, daughter of George Booth, 2nd Earl of Warrington
 Mary Moss (1791–1875), second wife of Samuel Booth, mother of William Booth who founded The Salvation Army
 Mary Booth (physician) (1869–1956), Australian physician and welfare worker